John Atkinson (7 June 1878 – 20 November 1951) was an English first-class cricketer. Atkinson was a left-handed batsman who bowled slow left-arm orthodox. He was born at Eastwood, Nottinghamshire.

Atkinson made his first-class debut for Nottinghamshire against the Marylebone Cricket Club at Lord's in 1899. The following season he made three first-class appearances in the 1900 County Championship against Yorkshire, Derbyshire and Lancashire. He made three further first-class appearances in 1901, against the Marylebone Cricket Club, Gloucestershire in the County Championship and the touring South Africans. In his seven first-class matches he took 10 wickets at an average of 42.50, with best figures of 1/28. With the bat, he scored a total of 40 runs in at a batting average of 5.00 and a high score of 19. He played six matches for Todmorden Cricket Club in the Lancashire League in 1902.

He died at Bentley with Arksey, Yorkshire on 20 November 1951. His uncle Frederick Wyld also played first-class cricket.

References

External links
John Atkinson at ESPNcricinfo
John Atkinson at CricketArchive

1878 births
1951 deaths
People from Eastwood, Nottinghamshire
Cricketers from Nottinghamshire
English cricketers
Nottinghamshire cricketers